Kłopotnica  is a village in the administrative district of Gmina Mirsk, within Lwówek Śląski County, Lower Silesian Voivodeship, in south-western Poland, close to the Czech border. Prior to 1945 it was in Germany and before that  back to the early Middle Ages it was part of Polish kingdom.

References

Villages in Lwówek Śląski County